Yatala (is a suburb in the City of Gold Coast, Queensland, Australia.

Geography
Surrounding suburbs of Yatala include Beenleigh, Windaroo, and Stapylton. Yatala and adjoining suburbs are located near the confluence of the Albert River, which is at the northern end of the suburb.

Etymology
The suburb takes its name from a property on the Albert River which was named by a South Australian after Yatala Harbor near Port Augusta, South Australia. The word is presumed to be from the Kaurna Aboriginal word 'yertalla', meaning water running by the side of a river. As a place name it specifically referred to the inundation of the usually-dry plain either side of Dry Creek in South Australia after heavy rain.

History
St Mary's Catholic Church was officially opened by Bishop James Quinn on Sunday 12 December 1875. The church was originally built as a masonic hall. The church building is no longer extant.

St Joseph's School opened on November 1875 and closed on December 1877.

In 1988, Bernie Powers operating as Power's Brewery opened a new brewery in Yatala. Powers entered a joint venture with Carlton & United Breweries (CUB) in 1992 and then sold completely to them in 1993. For CUB, it provided a modern efficient plant on a large site, ideal for their northern brewing operations. By 2010, CUB had expanded by the plant to over 20 times its original size, enabling it to produce one quarter of Australia's beer.

Rivermount College opened on 1992.

Since 2006, development has been rapidly occurring within the suburb, with over 300 businesses now established within its boundaries. This type of urban development is predicted to eventually encompass all the semi-rural land currently separating the Brisbane Metropolitan Area and Gold Coast City.

Economy
The Yatala Brewery is on a site bounded by Cuthbert Drive (and the Pacific Motorway) to the east, Darlington Drive to the north and Pearson Road to the west. 

Yatala is the base for Supercar team Matt Stone Racing, and was previously the base for Stone Brothers Racing and later Erebus Motorsport.

Kanga Loaders, a heavy machinery manufacturer, are headquartered in Yatala.

Education
Rivermount College is a private primary and secondary (Prep-12) school for boys and girls at Rivermount Drive. In 2018, the school had an enrolment of 917 students with 66 teachers (64 full-time equivalent) and 50 non-teaching staff (39 full-time equivalent).

There are no government schools in Yatala. The nearest government primary schools are Norfolk Village State School in neighbouring Ormeau to the south-east and Mount Warren Park State School in neighbouring Mount Warren Park. to the north-west. The nearest government secondary schools are Ormeau Woods State High School in neighbouring Ormeau to the south-east, Beenleigh State High School in Beenleigh to the north-west, and Windaroo Valley State High School in neighbouring Windaroo to the west.

Amenities
There are no permanent public libraries in the vicinity of Yatala (Yatala residents are ineligible to use the nearby Beenleigh public library as it is operated by the Logan City Council), however the Gold Coast City Council operates a mobile library which regularly visits the nearby suburb of Ormeau.

There are a number of parks in the area:

 Beenleigh Special Needs Park
 Brewery Reserve

 Darlington Drive Park

 David Arbon Park

 Enkleman Road Park

 Ferguson Park

 Freeway Reserve Yatala

 Gassman Reserve

 Link Park

 Lower Halfway Creek Parklands

 Luscombe Reserve East

 Luscombe Reserve West

 Pagan Parklands

 Paterson Park

 Sears Road Reserve

 Stanmore Park

 Yatala Laneway Reserve

Transport
Yatala is linked to both Beenleigh and Ormeau railway stations by bus routes 728 and 729, operated by Surfside Buslines.

Attractions
Yatala is home to the Yatala Pie Shop which claims to have been "a landmark in the Yatala area" for "more than 130 years" . The restaurant is considered a common stop-over for travellers between Brisbane and the Gold Coast.

References

Suburbs of the Gold Coast, Queensland